Semporna Airport  is an airport serving the town of Semporna in the east Malaysian state of Sabah. At present, the airport is not served by any commercial civilian flights.

See also

 List of airports in Malaysia

References

External links

Short Take-Off and Landing Airports (STOL) at Malaysia Airports Holdings Berhad

Airports in Sabah
Semporna District